Atelurius is a monotypic genus of South American jumping spiders containing the single species, Atelurius segmentatus. It was first described by Eugène Louis Simon in 1901, and is only found in Brazil and Venezuela.

References

Monotypic Salticidae genera
Salticidae
Spiders of South America